Acalles is a genus of beetles in the family Curculionidae. Beetles of this genus can be found in southeastern North America living among leaf litter or dead branches and vines. There are at least 570 species in the Acalles genus.

See also
 List of Acalles species

References 

Molytinae